The  ( or ), translated as The Song of the Nibelungs, is an epic poem written around 1200 in Middle High German. Its anonymous poet was likely from the region of Passau. The  is based on an oral tradition of Germanic heroic legend that has some of its origin in historic events and individuals of the 5th and 6th centuries and that spread throughout almost all of Germanic-speaking Europe. Scandinavian parallels to the German poem are found especially in the heroic lays of the Poetic Edda and in the Völsunga saga.

The poem is split into two parts. In the first part, the prince Siegfried comes to Worms to acquire the hand of the Burgundian princess Kriemhild from her brother King Gunther. Gunther agrees to let Siegfried marry Kriemhild if Siegfried helps Gunther acquire the warrior-queen Brünhild as his wife. Siegfried does this and marries Kriemhild; however, Brünhild and Kriemhild become rivals, leading eventually to Siegfried's murder by the Burgundian vassal Hagen with Gunther's involvement. In the second part, the widow Kriemhild is married to Etzel, king of the Huns. She later invites her brother and his court to visit Etzel's kingdom intending to kill Hagen. Her revenge results in the death of all the Burgundians who came to Etzel's court as well as the destruction of Etzel's kingdom and the death of Kriemhild herself.

The  was the first heroic epic put into writing in Germany, helping to found a larger genre of written heroic poetry there. The poem was forgotten after around 1500 but was rediscovered in 1755. Dubbed the "German Iliad", the  began a new life as the German national epic. The poem was appropriated for nationalist purposes and was heavily used in anti-democratic, reactionary, and Nazi propaganda before and during the Second World War. Its legacy today is most visible in Richard Wagner's operatic cycle , which, however, is mostly based on Old Norse sources. It has been called "one of the most impressive, and certainly the most powerful, of the German epics of the Middle Ages".

Manuscript sources

The poem in its various written forms was lost by the end of the 16th century, but manuscripts from as early as the 13th century were re-discovered during the 18th century. There are 37 known manuscripts of the Nibelungenlied and its variant versions. Eleven of these manuscripts are essentially complete. The oldest version seems to be the one preserved in manuscript "B". Twenty-four manuscripts are in various fragmentary states of completion, including one version in Dutch (manuscript "T").

The text contains approximately 2,400 stanzas in 39 . The title under which the poem has been known since its discovery is derived from the final line of one of the three main versions,  ("here the story takes an end: this is the lay of the Nibelungs").  here means "lay", "tale" or "epic" rather than its Modern German translation of "song".

The manuscripts' sources deviate considerably from one another.

Synopsis
The famous opening of the Nibelungenlied is actually thought to be an addition by the editor of manuscript "C" of the Nibelungenlied (MS C, for short), as it does not appear in the oldest manuscripts. It may have been inspired by the prologue of the Nibelungenklage.

Original (MS C)
Uns ist in alten mæren  wunders vil geseit
von helden lobebæren, von grôzer arebeit,
von fröuden, hôchgezîten,  von weinen und von klagen,
von küener recken strîten  muget ir nu wunder hœren sagen.

Modern German
Uns ist in alten Geschichten viel Staunenswertes gesagt
von ruhmwürdigen Helden, von großer Mühsal (im Kampf),
von Freuden und Festen, von Weinen und Klagen,
vom Kampf kühner Helden könnt ihr jetzt viel Staunenswertes sagen hören.

English
In ancient tales many marvels are told us:
of renowned heroes worthy of praise, of great hardship,
of joys, festivities, of weeping and lamenting,
of bold warriors' battles—now you may hear such marvels told.

The oldest manuscripts instead began with the introduction of Kriemhild, the protagonist of the work.

The epic is divided into two parts, the first dealing with the story of Siegfried and Kriemhild, the wooing of Brünhild and the death of Siegfried at the hands of Hagen, and Hagen's hiding of the Nibelung treasure in the river Rhine (Chapters 1–19). The second part deals with Kriemhild's marriage to Etzel (Attila, king of the Huns), her plans for revenge, the journey of the Burgundians to the court of Etzel, and their last stand in Etzel's hall (Chapters 20–39).

Siegfried and Kriemhild

The first chapter introduces the court of Burgundy. Kriemhild (the virgin sister of King Gunther and his brothers Gernot and Giselher) has a dream of a falcon that is killed by two eagles. Her mother interprets this to mean that Kriemhild's future husband will die a violent death, and Kriemhild consequently resolves to remain unmarried.

The second chapter tells of the background of Siegfried, crown prince of Xanten. His youth is narrated with little room for the adventures later attributed to him. In the third chapter, Siegfried arrives in Worms with the hopes of wooing Kriemhild. Upon his arrival, Hagen von Tronje, one of King Gunther's vassals, tells Gunther about Siegfried's youthful exploits that involved winning a treasure and lands from a pair of brothers, Nibelung and Schilbung, whom Siegfried had killed when he was unable to divide the treasure between them, and, almost incidentally, the killing of a dragon. Siegfried leaves his treasure in the charge of a dwarf named Alberich.

After killing the dragon, Siegfried then bathed in its blood which rendered him invulnerable except for a single spot on his back where a leaf from a linden tree had fallen on him. In spite of Hagen's threatening stories about his youth, the Burgundians welcome him, but do not allow him to meet the princess. Disappointed, he nonetheless remains in Worms and helps Gunther defeat the invading Saxons.

In Chapter 5, Siegfried finally meets Kriemhild. Gunther requests Siegfried to sail with him to the fictional city of Isenstein in Iceland to win the hand of Iceland's Queen, Brünhild. Siegfried agrees, though only if Gunther allows him to marry Gunther's sister, Kriemhild, whom Siegfried pines for. Gunther, Siegfried and a group of Burgundians set sail for Iceland with Siegfried pretending to be Gunther's vassal. Upon their arrival, Brünhild challenges Gunther to a trial of strength with her hand in marriage as a reward. If they lose, however, they will be sentenced to death. She challenges Gunther to three athletic contests, throwing a javelin, tossing a boulder, and a leap. After seeing the boulder and javelin, it becomes apparent to the group that Brünhild is immensely strong, and they fear for their lives.

Siegfried quietly returns to the boat on which his group had sailed and retrieves his special cloak, which renders him invisible and gives him the strength of 12 men (Chapters 6–8). Siegfried, with his immense strength, invisibly leads Gunther through the trials. Unknowingly deceived, the impressed Brünhild thinks King Gunther, not Siegfried, defeated her and agrees to marry Gunther. Gunther becomes afraid that Brünhild may yet be planning to kill them, so Siegfried goes to Nibelungenland and single-handedly conquers the kingdom. Siegfried makes them his vassals and returns with a thousand of them, himself going ahead as messenger. The group of Burgundians, Gunther and Gunther's new wife-to-be Brünhild return to Worms, where a grand reception awaits them, and they marry to much fanfare. Siegfried and Kriemhild are also then married with Gunther's blessings.

However, on their wedding night, Brünhild suspects something is amiss with her situation, particularly suspecting Siegfried as a potential cause. Gunther attempts to sleep with her, and, with her great strength, she easily ties him up and leaves him that way all night. After he tells Siegfried of this, Siegfried again offers his help, proposing that he slip into their chamber at night with his invisibility cloak and silently beat Brünhild into submission. Gunther agrees but says that Siegfried must not sleep with Brünhild. Siegfried slips into the room according to plan and after a difficult and violent struggle, an invisible Siegfried defeats Brünhild. Siegfried then takes her ring and belt, which are symbols of defloration. Here it is implied that Siegfried sleeps with Brünhild, despite Gunther's request. Afterwards, Brünhild no longer possesses her once-great strength and says she will no longer refuse Gunther. Siegfried gives the ring and belt to his own newlywed, Kriemhild, in Chapter 10.

Years later, Brünhild, still feeling as if she had been deceived, goads Gunther into inviting Siegfried and Kriemhild to their kingdom. Brünhild does this because she is still under the impression that Gunther married off his sister to a low-ranking vassal (Gunther and Siegfried are in reality of equal rank) and the proper relations between the two ranks have not been followed. Both Siegfried and Kriemhild come to Worms and all is friendly between the two until, before entering Worms Cathedral, Kriemhild and Brünhild argue over who should have precedence, in accordance their husbands' ranks.

Having been earlier deceived about the relationship between Siegfried and Gunther, Brünhild thinks it is obvious that she should go first, in right of her (self-perceived) superior rank. Kriemhild, unaware of the deception involved in Brünhild's wooing, insists that they are of equal rank, and the dispute escalates. Severely angered, Kriemhild shows Brünhild first the ring and then the belt that Siegfried took from Brünhild on her wedding night, and then calls her Siegfried's kebse (mistress or concubine). Brünhild feels greatly distressed and humiliated, and bursts into tears.

The argument between the queens is both a risk for the marriage of Gunther and Brünhild and a potential cause for a lethal rivalry between Gunther and Siegfried, which both Gunther and Siegfried attempt to avoid. Gunther acquits Siegfried of the charges. Despite this, Hagen von Tronje decides to kill Siegfried to protect the honor and reign of his king. Although it is Hagen who does the deed, Gunther, who at first objects to the plot, finally quietly assents. Hagen contrives a false military threat to Gunther, and Siegfried, considering Gunther a great friend, volunteers to help Gunther once again.

Under the pretext of this threat of war, Hagen persuades Kriemhild, who still trusts Hagen, to mark Siegfried's single vulnerable point on his clothing with a cross under the premise of protecting him. Now knowing Siegfried's weakness, the fake campaign is called off and Hagen then uses the cross as a target on a hunting trip, killing Siegfried with a javelin as he drinks from a brook (Chapter 16). Kriemhild becomes aware of Hagen's deed when, in Hagen's presence, the corpse of Siegfried bleeds from the wound (cruentation). Some years later, after Kriemhild begins to use the hoard of treasure to attract warriors to her personal retinue, Hagen steals the treasure from her.

Kriemhild's revenge
Kriemhild swears to take revenge for the murder of her husband and the theft of her treasure. Many years later, King Etzel of the Huns proposes to Kriemhild, she journeys to the land of the Huns, and they are married. For the baptism of their son, she invites her brothers, the Burgundians, to a feast at Etzel's castle in Hungary. Hagen does not want to go, suspecting that it is a trick by Kriemhild in order to take revenge and kill them all, but he is taunted until he does. As the Burgundians cross the river Danube, this fate is confirmed by Nixes (Germanic water spirits), who predict that all but one monk will die. Hagen tries to drown the monk in order to render the prophecy futile, but he survives.

The Burgundians arrive at Etzel's castle and are welcomed by Kriemhild "with lying smiles and graces", but the lord Dietrich of Bern, an ally of Etzel's, advises the Burgundians to keep their weapons with them at all times, which is normally not allowed. The tragedy unfolds as Kriemhild comes before Hagen, reproaching him for her husband Siegfried's death, and demands that he return her Nibelungenschatz, the Nibelungen treasure. Not only does Hagen humiliate her by openly carrying Balmung, Siegfried's sword stolen from his corpse, but also admits to killing Siegfried and stealing the Nibelungen treasure. Hagen blames all these acts on Kriemhild's own behavior.

King Etzel then welcomes his wife's brothers warmly. But outside the tense feast in the great hall, a fight breaks out between Huns and Burgundians. When word of the fight arrives at the feast, Hagen decapitates the young son of Kriemhild and Etzel before their eyes. The Burgundians take control of the hall, which is besieged by Etzel's warriors. Kriemhild offers her brothers their lives if they hand over Hagen, but they refuse. The battle lasts all day, until the queen orders the hall to be burned with the Burgundians inside.

All of the Burgundians are killed except for Hagen and Gunther, who are bound and held prisoner by Dietrich of Bern. Kriemhild has the men brought before her and orders her brother Gunther to be killed. Even after seeing Gunther's head, Hagen refuses to tell the queen what he has done with the Nibelungen treasure. Furious, Kriemhild herself cuts off Hagen's head. Old Hildebrand, the mentor of Dietrich of Bern, is infuriated by the shameful deaths of the Burgundian guests. He hews Kriemhild to pieces with his sword. In a fifteenth-century manuscript, he is said to strike Kriemhild a single clean blow to the waist; she feels no pain, however, and declares that his sword is useless. Hildebrand then drops a ring and commands Kriemhild to pick it up. As she bends down, her body falls into pieces. Dietrich and Etzel and all the people of the court lament the deaths of so many heroes.

Authorship and dating
The Nibelungenlied, like other Middle High German heroic epics, is anonymous. This anonymity extends to discussions of literature in other Middle High German works: although it is common practice to judge or praise the poems of others, no other poet refers to the author of the Nibelungenlied. Attempts to identify the Nibelungenlied-poet with known authors, such as Bligger von Steinach, to whom a lost epic is attributed by Gottfried von Strassburg, have not found wide acceptance. The poem is nevertheless believed to have had a single author, possibly working in a "Nibelungen workshop" ("") together with the author of the Nibelungenklage. The latter work identifies a "meister Konrad" as the author of an original Latin version of the Nibelungenlied, but this is generally taken for a fiction. Although a single Nibelungenlied-poet is often posited, the degree of variance in the text and its background in an amorphous oral tradition mean that ideas of authorial intention must be applied with caution. It is also possible that there were several poets involved, perhaps under the direction of a single "leader" who could be considered the "Nibelungenlied-poet".

The Nibelungenlied is conventionally dated to around the year 1200. Wolfram von Eschenbach references the cook Rumolt, usually taken to be an invention of the Nibelungenlied-poet, in his romance Parzival (c. 1204/5), thereby providing an upper bound on the date the epic must have been composed. Additionally, the poem's rhyming technique most closely resembles that used between 1190 and 1205. Attempts to show that the poem alludes to various historical events have generally not been convincing.

The current theory of the creation of the poem emphasizes the poet's concentration on the region of Passau: for example, the poem highlights the relatively unimportant figure of Bishop Pilgrim of Passau, and the poet's geographical knowledge appears much more firm in this region than elsewhere. These facts, combined with the dating, have led scholars to believe that Wolfger von Erla, Bishop of Passau (reigned 1191–1204) was the patron of the poem. Wolfger is known to have patronized other literary figures, such as Walther von der Vogelweide and Thomasin von Zirclaere. The attention paid to Bishop Pilgrim, who represents the real historical figure Bishop Pilgrim of Passau, would thus be an indirect homage to Wolfger. Wolfger was, moreover, attempting to establish the sainthood of Pilgrim at the time of the poem's composition, giving an additional reason for his prominence.

Some debate exists as to whether the poem is an entirely new creation or whether there was a previous version. German medievalist Jan-Dirk Müller claims that the poem in its written form is entirely new, although he admits the possibility that an orally transmitted epic with relatively consistent contents could have preceded it. German philologist Elisabeth Lienert, on the other hand, posits an earlier version of the text from around 1150 due to the Nibelungenlied's use of a stanzaic form current around that time (see Form and style).

Whoever the poet may have been, they appear to have had a knowledge of German Minnesang and chivalric romance. The poem's concentration on love (minne) and its depiction of Siegfried as engaging in love service for Kriemhild is in line with courtly romances of the time, with Heinrich von Veldeke's Eneasroman perhaps providing concrete models. Other possible influences are Hartmann von Aue's Iwein and Erec. These courtly elements are described by Jan-Dirk Müller as something of a façade, under which the older heroic ethos of the poem remains. Additionally, the poet seems to have known Latin literature. The role given to Kriemhild in the second (originally first) stanza is suggestive of Helen of Troy, and the poem appears to have taken a number of elements from Vergil's Aeneid. There is some debate as to whether the poet was acquainted with Old French chanson de geste.

Form and style
The language of the Nibelungenlied is characterized by its formulaic nature, a feature of oral poetry, meaning that similar or identical words, epithets, phrases, and even lines can be found in various positions throughout the poem. These elements can be used flexibly for different purposes in the poem. As the Nibelungenlied is generally thought to have been conceived as a written work, these elements are typically taken as signs of "fictive orality" ("") that underscore the connection of the poem to its traditionally oral subject matter.

The Nibelungenlied is written in four-line stanzas. Although no melody has survived for the text, melodies for similar stanzas in other German heroic poems have, so that it is certain that the text was meant to be sung. The stanza consists of three  ("long lines"), which consist of three metrical feet, a caesura, and three metrical feet following the caesura. The fourth line adds an additional foot following the caesura, making it longer than the other three and marking the end of the stanza. The final word before the caesura is typically female (a stressed syllable followed by an unstressed syllable), whereas the final word of a line is typical male (a stressed syllable). The lines rhyme in pairs, and occasionally there are internal rhymes between the words at the end of the caesura, as in the first stanza (see Synopsis). Medieval German literature scholar Victor Millet uses the poem's sixth stanza as an example of this metrical form. An acute accent indicates the stressed beat of a metrical foot, and || indicates the caesura:

Ze Wórmez bí dem Ríne || si wónten mít ir kráft.
in díente vón ir lánden || vil stólziu ríterscáft
mit lóbelíchen éren || unz án ir éndes zít.
si stúrben sit jǽmerlíche || von zwéier édelen fróuwen nít.

Many stanzas of the poem are constructed in a much less regular manner. It is likely that the Nibelungenlied cites an oral story-telling tradition in using singable stanzas; however, the longer final line is generally thought to belong to a more refined artistic milieu, as later heroic epics typically use a stanza without this longer final line (the so-called "Hildebrandston"). The stanzaic form of the Nibelungenlied, on the other hand, is shared with the Danubian minnesinger known as Der von Kürenberg who flourished in the 1150s and 1160s. The Nibelungenlied-poet may have been inspired by this lyrical stanza. Their use of the stanza would thus cite an oral story-telling tradition while at the same time creating some distance to it. Philologist Andreas Heusler supposed that the poet had taken some earlier orally transmitted stanzas and added a fourth foot to their final line, as these supposedly older stanzas are characterized by a more archaic vocabulary as well. German medievalist Jan-Dirk Müller notes that while it would be typical of a medieval poet to incorporate lines from other works in their own, no stanza of the Nibelungenlied can be proven to have come from an older poem.

The nature of the stanza creates a structure whereby the narrative progresses in blocks: the first three lines carry the story forward, while the fourth introduces foreshadowing of the disaster at the end or comments on events. The fourth line is thus often the most formulaic of the stanza. Stanzas often seem to have been placed after each other without necessarily being causally or narratively connected; for instance, two consecutive stanzas might portray two different reactions to an event by the same figure. Often, the same reaction is given to multiple figures in different stanzas, so that the impression of collective rather than individual reactions is created. Enjambment between stanzas is very rare. The epic frequently creates multiple motivations for events, some of which may contradict each other. This style of narration also causes the events within the poem to come to a frequent halt, which can last for years within the time portrayed in the poem. The division of the epic into  underlines the disconnect between the various episodes. The connection between the first half of the epic (Siegfried's murder) and the second half (Kriemhild's marriage to Etzel) is especially loose. The epic nevertheless maintains the causal and narrative connection between episodes through the commentary of the narrator, who frequently reminds the poem's audience of the coming catastrophe, while the manner in which the epic is told serves to delay the inevitable disaster. The action becomes more and more intense as the epic nears its end.

Origins

Historical origins and development of the saga

Behind Nibelungenlied stands a large oral tradition, the so-called Nibelungen saga. This oral tradition, moreover, continued to exist following the composition of the Nibelungenlied, as proven by the Rosengarten zu Worms and Das Lied vom Hürnen Seyfrid, both of which were written later than the Nibelungenlied but contain elements of the saga that are absent in it. These oral traditions have, at least in some cases, a historical core. However, various historical events and figures have been melded together into a single plot in such a way that the original historical context has been lost. The epic, and presumably the oral traditions that provided its material, have transformed historical events into relatively simple narrative schemas that can be compared with other, similar (originally) oral narratives from other cultures. What had originally been political motivations have been "personalized", so that political events are explained through personal preferences, likes, dislikes, and feuds rather than purely by realpolitik. Various historical personages, moreover, appear to be contemporaries in the poem despite not having lived at the same time historically.

The Nibelungen saga also seems to have had an early reception in Scandinavia, so that parallel stories are found among the heroic lays of the Poetic Edda (written down in 1270 but containing at least some much older material) and in the Völsunga saga (written down in the second half of the thirteenth century). While the Norse texts were once usually considered to contain a more original version of the Nibelungen saga, newer scholarship has called this into question and notes that the connections made to Norse mythology and Germanic paganism, such as the semi-divine origin of the Nibelungen hoard, are likely more recent developments that are therefore unique to the Scandinavian tradition. Some elements of the Norse tradition, however, are assuredly older.

The death of the Burgundians finds its origins in the destruction of the historical Burgundian kingdom on the Rhine. This kingdom, under the rule of king Gundaharius, was destroyed by the Roman general Flavius Aetius in 436/437, with survivors resettled in eastern Gaul in a region centered around modern-day Geneva and Lyon (at the time known as Lugdunum). The Lex Burgundionum, codified by the Burgundian king Gundobad at the end of the sixth century, contains many names that can be connected with the Nibelungen saga, including, besides Gundaharius, Gislaharius (Giselher), Gundomaris (possibly the historical figure behind the Old Norse Gothorm, who is replaced by Gernot in the German tradition), and Gibica (attested in Germany as Gibich but not found in the Nibelungenlied). Although the Burgundian kingdom on the Rhine is thus historically attested, the saga locates its destruction at the court of Attila (Etzel), king of the Huns. The destruction of Attila's kingdom itself is likely inspired by Attila's sudden death following his wedding in 453, which was popularly blamed on his wife, a Germanic woman named Hildico. Her name, containing the element hild, may have inspired that of Kriemhild. Kriemhild most likely originally killed Etzel and avenged her relatives rather than her husband, but this change had already taken place some time before the creation of the Nibelungenlied. Jan-Dirk Müller doubts that we can be certain which version is more original given that in both cases Kriemhild brings about the destruction of the Hunnish kingdom. The differences may be because the continental saga is more favorable to Attila than the Norse, and so Attila could not be held directly responsible for the treacherous invitation of the Burgundians.

Unlike the Burgundians, Siegfried cannot be firmly identified with a historical figure. He may have his origins in the Merovingian dynasty, where names beginning with the element Sigi- were common and where there was also a famous and violent queen Brunhilda (543–613). The feud between this historical Brunhilda and the rival queen Fredegund may have provided the origin of the feud between Brünhild and Kriemhild. The name Siegfried itself is a relatively recent one, only being attested from the seventh century onward, meaning that the original name may have been equivalent to the Old Norse Sigurd. Scholars such as Otto Höfler have speculated that Siegfried and his slaying of the dragon may be a mythologized reflection of Arminius and his defeat of the Roman legions in the Battle of the Teutoburg Forest in 9 AD. Jan-Dirk Müller suggests that Siegfried likely has a more mythological origin. The story of the destruction of the Burgundians and Siegfried appear to have been originally unconnected. The Old Norse Atlakviða, a poem likely originally from the ninth century that has been reworked as part of the Poetic Edda, tells the story of the death of the Burgundians without any mention of Sigurd (Siegfried) and can be taken as an attestation for an older tradition. In fact, the earliest attested work to connect Siegfried explicitly with the destruction of the Burgundians is the Nibelungenlied itself, though Old Norse parallels make it clear that this tradition must have existed orally for some time.

The Nibelungenlied-poet's reworking of the saga
When composing the Nibelungenlied, its poet was faced with setting an oral tradition down into a definitive version although that tradition was by its very nature amorphous. In choosing which elements of the saga to include in his version, the poet therefore often incorporated two versions of an event that were likely not combined in the oral tradition. An example is the beginning of the fighting in Etzel's hall, which is motivated both by an attack on the Burgundians' supplies and Hagen's killing of prince Ortlieb. The Old Norse Thidrekssaga, which is based on German sources, contains only the second element, meaning that the two motivations were likely variants that were hardly ever combined in practice. Victor Millet concludes that the poet deliberately doubles the motivations or occurrences of various events, including Siegfried's wooing of Kriemhild, the deception of Brünhild, Hagen's humiliation of Kriemhild, and Kriemhild's demand for the return of Nibelungen treasure.

The poet also appears to have significantly altered various aspects of the saga. Most significantly, the poet has suppressed the mythological or fantastical elements of Siegfried's story. When these elements are introduced, it is in a retrospective tale narrated by Hagen that reduces the slaying of the dragon to a single stanza. Hagen's story, moreover, does not accord with Siegfried's youth as the narrator of the Nibelungenlied has portrayed it, in which he receives a courtly education in Xanten. More elaborate stories about Siegfried's youth are found in the Thidrekssaga and in the later heroic ballad Das Lied vom Hürnen Seyfrid, both of which appear to preserve German oral traditions about the hero that the Nibelungenlied-poet decided to suppress for their poem.

The portrayal of Kriemhild, particularly in the first half of the romance, as a courtly lady is likely an invention of the Nibelungenlied-poet. Earlier (and many later) attestations of Kriemhild outside of the Nibelungenlied portray her as obsessed with power and highlight her treachery to her brothers rather than her love for her husband as her motivation for betraying them. The poet still uses images from this traditional picture, but given the new motivation of the poem's Kriemhild, their meaning has changed. For instance, when Kriemhild demands that Hagen give back what he has taken from her, a traditional motif known from the Norse versions, she could mean the stolen hoard, but she could also mean her murdered husband. Hagen, similarly, in demanding that Gunther first be killed before he reveals the hoard's location, even though the hoard is at the bottom of the Rhine and cannot be retrieved, reveals Kriemhild's mercilessness while also showing his own duplicity. It is unclear which figure is in the right and which in the wrong.

Medieval influence and reception
With 36 manuscripts, the Nibelungenlied appears to have been one of the most popular works of the German Middle Ages and seems to have found a very broad audience. The poem is quoted by Wolfram von Eschenbach in his Parzival and Willehalm and likely inspired his use of stanzas in his unfinished Titurel. The manuscript witnesses and medieval references to the Nibelungenlied show that medieval recipients were most interested in the Nibelungenlied as the story of the destruction of the Burgundians; the first half of the poem was often shortened or otherwise summarized. The Ambraser Heldenbuch titles its copy of the Nibelungenlied with "Ditz Puech heysset Chrimhilt" (this book is named "Kriemhild"), showing that she was seen as the most important character.

The areas of medieval interest seem in particular to have been the inescapability of the slaughter at the end of the poem and Kriemhild and Hagen's culpability or innocence. The earliest attested reception of the Nibelungenlied, the Nibelungenklage, which was likely written only shortly afterwards, shows an attempt both to make sense of the horror of the destruction and to absolve Kriemhild of blame. The C version of the Nibelungenlied, redacted around the same time as the Klage, shows a similar strategy. The presence of the Nibelungenklage in all manuscripts of the Nibelungenlied shows that the ending of the Nibelungenlied itself was evidently unsatisfying to its primary audience without some attempt to explain these two "scandalous" elements. The Rosengarten zu Worms, on the other hand, demonizes Kriemhild thoroughly, while the late-medieval Lied vom Hürnen Seyfrid takes her side even more strongly.

As the first Middle High German heroic poem to be written, the Nibelungenlied can be said to have founded an entire genre of Middle High German literature. As a result, other Middle High German heroic poems are sometimes described as "post-Nibelungian" ("nachnibelungisch"). The majority of these epics revolve around the hero Dietrich von Bern, who plays a secondary role in the Nibelungenlied: it is likely that his presence there inspired these new poems. Many of the following heroic epics appear to respond to aspects of the Nibelungenlied: the Kudrun (c. 1250), for instance, has been described as a reply to the Nibelungenlied that reverses the heroic tragedy of the previous poem. Kudrun herself is sometimes seen as a direct reversal of Kriemhild, as she makes peace among warring factions rather than driving them to their deaths. No Middle High German heroic epic after the Nibelungenlied maintains the tragic heroic atmosphere that characterized earlier Germanic heroic poetry, and the later poems are often further hybridized with elements of chivalric romance.

Reception of the Nibelungenlied ceases after the fifteenth century: the work is last copied in manuscript as part of the Ambraser Heldenbuch around 1508, and its last mention is by the Viennese historian Wolfgang Lazius in two works from 1554 and 1557 respectively. It was not printed and appears to have been forgotten. The Nibelungen saga, however, was not forgotten completely; the Rosengarten zu Worms was printed as part of the printed Heldenbuch until 1590 and inspired several plays in the early seventeenth century, while Hürnen Seyfrid continued to be printed into the nineteenth century in a prose version.

Modern reception

After having been forgotten for two hundred years, the Nibelungenlied manuscript C was rediscovered by Jacob Hermann Obereit in 1755. That same year, Johann Jacob Bodmer publicized the discovery, publishing excerpts and his own reworkings of the poem. Bodmer dubbed the Nibelungenlied the "German Iliad" (""), a comparison that skewed the reception of the poem by comparing it to the poetics of a classical epic. Bodmer attempted to make the Nibelungenlied conform more closely to these principles in his own reworkings of the poem, leaving off the first part in his edition, titled Chriemhilden Rache, in order to imitate the in medias res technique of Homer. He later rewrote the second part in dactylic hexameter under the title Die Rache der Schwester (1767). Bodmer's placement of the Nibelungenlied in the tradition of classical epic had a detrimental effect on its early reception: when presented with a full edition of the medieval poem by Christoph Heinrich Myller, King Frederick II famously called the Nibelungenlied "not worth a shot of powder" (""). Goethe was similarly unimpressed, and Hegel compared the epic unfavorably to Homer. The epic nevertheless had its supporters, such as August Wilhelm Schlegel, who called it a "great tragedy" ("") in a series of lectures from 1802/3. Many early supporters sought to distance German literature from French Classicism and belonged to artistic movements such as Sturm und Drang.

As a consequence of the comparison of the Nibelungenlied to the Iliad, the Nibelungenlied came to be seen as the German national epic in the earlier nineteenth century, particularly in the context of the Napoleonic Wars. The Nibelungenlied was supposed to embody German bourgeois virtues that the French were seen as lacking. This interpretation of the epic continued during the Biedermeier period, during which the heroic elements of the poem were mostly ignored in favor of those that could more easily be integrated into a bourgeois understanding of German virtue. The translation of the Nibelungenlied by Karl Simrock into modern German in 1827 was especially influential in popularizing the epic and remains influential today. Also notable from this period is the three-part dramatic tragedy Die Nibelungen by Friedrich Hebbel.

Following the founding of the German Empire, recipients began to focus more on the heroic aspects of the poem, with the figure of Siegfried in particular becoming an identifying figure for German nationalism. Especially important for this new understanding of the poem was Richard Wagner's operatic cycle Der Ring des Nibelungen, which, however, was based almost entirely on the Old Norse versions of the Nibelung saga. Wagner's preference for the Old Norse versions followed a popular judgment of the time period: the Nordic versions were seen as being more "original" than the courtly story portrayed in the German poem. In the First World War, the alliance between Germany and Austria-Hungary came to be described as possessing Nibelungen-Treue (Nibelungen loyalty), referring to the loyalty to death between Hagen and the Burgundians. While militaristic, the use of imagery from the Nibelungenlied remained optimistic in this period rather than focusing on the doom at the end of the epic.

The interwar period saw the Nibelungenlied enter the world of cinema in Fritz Lang's two part film Die Nibelungen (1924/1925), which tells the entire story of the poem. At the same time, the Nibelungenlied was heavily employed in anti-democratic propaganda following the defeat of Germany and Austria-Hungary. The epic supposedly showed that the German people were more well suited to a heroic, aristocratic form of life than democracy. The betrayal and murder of Siegfried was explicitly compared to the "stab in the back" that the German army had supposedly received. At the same time, Hagen and his willingness to sacrifice himself and fight to the death made him into a central figure in the reception of the poem. During the Second World War, Hermann Göring would explicitly use this aspect of the Nibelungenlied to celebrate the sacrifice of the German army at Stalingrad and compare the Soviets to Etzel's Asiatic Huns.

Postwar reception and adaptation of the poem, reacting to its misuse by the Nazis, is often parodic. At the same time, the poem continues to play a role in regional culture and history, particularly in Worms and other places mentioned in the Nibelungenlied. Much discussion has centered on whether and how the epic ought to be taught in schools. The material of the Nibelungen saga has continued to inspire new adaptations. These include Die Nibelungen, a German remake of Fritz Lang's film from 1966/67, and the television film Dark Kingdom: The Dragon King from 2004. However, the majority of popular adaptations of the material today in film, computer games, comic books, etc., are not based on the medieval epic directly.

Outside of Germany, most reception of the Nibelungen material has taken place via Wagner, although the epic has been translated into English numerous times.

Editions
(in chronological order)

 Das Nibelungenlied in der ältesten Gestalt mit den Veränderungen des gemeinen Textes. Herausgegeben und mit einem Wörterbuch versehen von Adolf Holtzmann. Stuttgart 1857 (Google, Google)
 Karl Bartsch, Der Nibelunge Nôt : mit den Abweichungen von der Nibelunge Liet, den Lesarten sämmtlicher Handschriften und einem Wörterbuche, Leipzig: F. A. Brockhaus, 1870–1880
 Michael S. Batts. Das Nibelungenlied, critical edition, Tübingen: M. Niemeyer 1971. 
 Helmut de Boor. Das Nibelungenlied, 22nd revised and expanded edition, ed. Roswitha Wisniewski, Wiesbaden 1988, . This edition is based ultimately on that of Bartsch.
 Ursula Schulze, Das Nibelungenlied, Düsseldorf / Zürich: Artemis & Winkler 2005. . Based on manuscript C.
 Hermann Reichert, Das Nibelungenlied, Berlin: de Gruyter 2005. VII, . Edition of manuscript B, normalized text; introduction in German.
 Walter Kofler (Ed.), Nibelungenlied und Klage. Redaktion I, Stuttgart: Hirzel 2011. . Manuscript I.
 Walter Kofler (Ed.), Nibelungenlied. Redaktion D, Stuttgart: Hirzel 2012. . Manuscript D.
  Text, translation and commentary, based on manuscript B.

Translations and adaptations

English 
 Alice Horton, Translator. The Lay of the Nibelungs: Metrically Translated from the Old German Text, G. Bell and Sons, London, 1898.  Line by line translation of the "B manuscript".  (Deemed the most accurate of the "older translations" in Encyclopedia of literary translation into English: M-Z, Volume 2, edited by Olive Classe, 2000, Taylor & Francis, pp. 999–1000.)
 Margaret Armour, Translator. Franz Schoenberner, Introduction. Edy Legrand, Illustrator. The Nibelungenlied, Heritage Press, New York, 1961
 Arthur Thomas Hatto, The Nibelungenlied, Penguin Classics 1964.  English translation and extensive critical and historical appendices.
 Robert Lichtenstein. The Nibelungenlied, Translated and introduced by Robert Lichtenstein.  (Studies in German Language and Literature Number: 9).  Lewiston, New York: Edwin Mellen Press, 1992.  . .
 Burton Raffel, Das Nibelungenlied, new translation. Foreword by Michael Dirda. Introduction by Edward R. Haymes. Yale University Press 2006. . 
 Michael Manning (Illustrator), Erwin Tschofen (Author), sum legio publishing, 2010. .
 Cyril Edwards, translated with an introduction and notes,

Modern German 
 Das Nibelungenlied. Translated by Karl Bartsch. Leipzig 1867 (Google)
 Das Nibelungenlied. Translated by Karl Simrock. Stuttgart 1868 (Google)
 Das Nibelungenlied. Zweisprachig, parallel text, edited and translated by Helmut de Boor. Sammlung Dieterich, 4th edition, Leipzig 1992, .
  - parallel text based on the edition of Karl Bartsch and Helmut de Boor
 Albrecht Behmel, Das Nibelungenlied, translation, Ibidem Verlag, 2nd edition, Stuttgart 2001,

Italian 
 Laura Mancinelli, I Nibelunghi, Translated in Italian from the Old German Text with an introduction and notes, Giulio Einaudi Editore, Turin 1972,

Spanish 
 Jesús García Rodríguez, translator, El cantar de los nibelungos, Editorial Akal, Colección Vía Láctea, Madrid, 2018, 464 p.  (Spanish metric translation with study).

See also

German mythology
Nibelungs
Sigurd
Völsunga saga
Kudrun
Der Ring des Nibelungen (Wagner)

Notes

References

 

 

 

  English translation:

External links

 Complete list of manuscripts (Handschriftencensus)
 Facsimile of manuscript C
 On-going audio recording in Middle High German

Editions
 Karl Bartsch edition (Leipzig, 1870–80)
 Transcriptions of the main manuscripts (ABCndk)
 Die Nibelungen-Werkstatt Synoptic edition of all the complete manuscripts

English translations
 
 Translation by Daniel B. Shumway available from The Medieval & Classical Literature Library
 Translation by Daniel B. Shumway available from Project Gutenberg
 The Nibelungenlied: Translated into Rhymed English Verse in the Metre of the Original by George Henry Needler
 The Lay of the Nibelungs – A line by line translation of the "B manuscript" by Alice Horton
 

12th-century books
13th-century books
12th-century poems
13th-century poems
Epic poems in German
Early Germanic literature
Medieval legends
Memory of the World Register
Middle High German literature
Nibelung tradition
Völsung cycle
Worms, Germany
Works of unknown authorship